Germán Bernácer Tormo (born 29 July 1883 in Alicante - died June 1965) was an economist from Spain.

See also 
 Germán Bernácer Prize

References

1883 births
1965 deaths